The dragon and daughter  (Danish: lindorm og jomfru) is a Danish folktale.

Story 
Once upon a time, a father was gathering nuts in the forest for his daughter. One nut had a worm inside, which the daughter took care of. Over time, the worm grew into a dragon. The daughter was not able to send away the dragon. On the advice of the villager, the daughter left with the Lindworm for an island. However, the island did not have a hill, so the daughter and dragon moved to the north of the island. Daughter and dragon lived in Lundø island for several years. Dragon lived digging hole in Lundø island. There was the place with the hill called Hald. The dragon and daughter lived in Hald. It is said that the place was called Lindhöj.(mean "The hill of the dragon").

Original text

Notes

See also
Dragon of Mordiford
Danish folklore

References
Evald Tang Kristensen:"Danske Sagn: Ellefolk, Nisser og adskillige Uhyrer, samt religiøse Sagn, Lys og Varsler" Arhus,1893,Vol.2,E,No.28,p183.

Dragons
Danish fairy tales